Lithakia is a village in the southern part of the island of Zakynthos, Greece. In 2011 its population was 1,307. It is situated at the foot of low hills, about 2 km from the Ionian Sea coast. It is 3 km west of the beach village Laganas, 5 km southeast of Machairado and 9 km southwest of Zakynthos (city). The village suffered great damage from the 1953 Ionian earthquake.

Population

See also
List of settlements in Zakynthos

References

External links
Lithakia at the GTP Travel Pages

Populated places in Zakynthos
Villages in Greece